Crowder is a town in Pittsburg County, Oklahoma, United States. The population was 430 at the 2010 census.

History 
At the time of its founding, Crowder was located in Tobucksy County, Choctaw Nation, in the Indian Territory.  The settlement was originally called Juanita, after Juanita Harlan Crowder, wife of Dr. W.E. Crowder, an early-day physician.  A post office was established at Juanita, Indian Territory on March 21, 1902.  Its name was changed to Crowder on June 4, 1904, in honor of Dr. Crowder.

Geography
Crowder is located at  (35.121927, -95.671460).

Demographics

As of the census of 2000, there were 436 people, 159 households, and 127 families residing in the town. There were 183 housing units at an average density of 187.2 per square mile (72.1/km2). The racial makeup of the town was 85.09% White, 0.92% African American, 7.80% Native American, 0.46% Asian, 2.52% from other races, and 3.21% from two or more races. Hispanic or Latino of any race were 2.75% of the population.

There were 159 households, out of which 41.5% had children under the age of 18 living with them, 56.6% were married couples living together, 17.0% had a female householder with no husband present, and 19.5% were non-families. 17.6% of all households were made up of individuals, and 6.9% had someone living alone who was 65 years of age or older. The average household size was 2.74 and the average family size was 3.05.

In the town, the population was spread out, with 33.0% under the age of 18, 6.0% from 18 to 24, 25.0% from 25 to 44, 23.4% from 45 to 64, and 12.6% who were 65 years of age or older. The median age was 34 years. For every 100 females, there were 85.5 males. For every 100 females age 18 and over, there were 89.6 males.

The median income for a household in the town was $27,500, and the median income for a family was $31,364. Males had a median income of $25,833 versus $17,115 for females. The per capita income for the town was $11,394. About 11.7% of families and 15.8% of the population were below the poverty line, including 19.7% of those under age 18 and 19.2% of those age 65 or over.

References

External links
 Encyclopedia of Oklahoma History and Culture - Crowder

Towns in Pittsburg County, Oklahoma
Towns in Oklahoma